Patrick Brennan was an Irish Republican Army leader and Sinn Féin politician from Meelick, County Clare. He was interned after the Easter Rising in 1916. He was elected unopposed as a Teachta Dála (TD) for Clare constituency at the 1921 general election, and re-elected unopposed at the 1922 general election.  Brennan supported the Anglo-Irish Treaty. He resigned from the Dáil on 13 December 1922.

In May 1922, he was elected Garda Commissioner by the mutineers involved in the Civic Guard Mutiny, and later officially appointed Assistant Commissioner of the Garda Síochána.

References

Year of birth missing
Year of death missing
Early Sinn Féin TDs
Irish Republican Army (1919–1922) members
Garda Síochána officers
Members of the 2nd Dáil
Members of the 3rd Dáil
People of the Irish Civil War (Pro-Treaty side)